Pachypodium namaquanum, also known as halfmens or elephants trunk, is a succulent plant of Southern Africa.   The genus name Pachypodium is from the Greek for 'thick foot', an allusion to its swollen base, while the species name  namaquanum is a reference to Namaqualand.

Distribution
The succulent plant is native to the arid, rocky mountains of the Richtersveld in the Northern Cape of South Africa and in southern Namibia.

It is found in its greatest numbers in the Gariep Centre which has the greatest variety of succulents on earth. Rainfall here occurs mainly in winter and varies from 50 to 150 mm. Extremely arid conditions are to be found in the rain shadows of certain mountain ranges where the rainfall may be 15 mm or less. Thick fog moving inland from the Atlantic coast can add to the precipitation. Temperatures in summer may reach 50 °C.

Description
The warty trunk, thickset at the base and tapering to the top, is densely covered in sharp spines. Where damaged, the trunk produces side-branches that immediately curve back to the vertical. The very top of the plant is usually bent to the north, similar to the South American cactus Copiapoa cinerea.

There is a crown or tuft of undulate leaves at the apex of the trunk during the growing season which is throughout the winter months.

The tubular velvet-textured flowers appear from August to October and result in twin seedpods in a V-shape. These split down one side to release the wind-dispersed plumed seeds. Seen from a distance, the plant has the appearance of a person trudging up a slope whence its common name of halfmens (Afrikaans for 'semi-human'). It is also called elephant's trunk.

Conservation
The plant is CITES-listed as an Appendix 1 and 2 species, prohibiting trade unless the necessary certificates and permits have been obtained. The removal of this species by collectors poses a distinct threat to its survival.

Relationships
This plant belongs to the Apocynaceae family. There are 23 species of Pachypodium of which 18 occur in Madagascar and 5 in southern Africa - three of these are succulent spiny shrubs while  Pachypodium lealii, also tree-sized, occurs in the Kaokoveld in Namibia.

Gallery

References

namaquanum
Flora of Namibia
Flora of the Cape Provinces
Trees of South Africa
Near threatened flora of Africa